Frank William Gustine (February 20, 1920 – April 1, 1991) was an American Major League Baseball player who appeared in three All-Star Games during his 12-season (1939–50) MLB career. He spent the bulk of his tenure (1,176 games played) with the Pittsburgh Pirates, though he also played a season for the Chicago Cubs and played the last nine games of his career with the  St. Louis Browns. He also was a coach for the latter two months of that season for the Pirates.

The native of Hoopeston, Illinois, threw and batted right-handed.

Gustine played all positions in the infield, spending most of his time at first and second base. In 1,261 MLB games played, Gustine collected 1,214 hits, including 222 doubles and 47 triples. His best season was 1947, when he reached career highs in batting average (.297), hits (183), runs scored (102), and runs batted in (67).

His roommate during his career with the Pirates was Hall of Famer Ralph Kiner.

Other sports
During baseball off-seasons, Gustine coached the basketball team at Waynesburg College.

Post-baseball career
In 1954, Gustine and Lee Handley began a daily 15-minute sports program on KDKA radio in Pittsburgh, Pennsylvania. They had previously worked together on both radio and TV programs. Gustine also had a restaurant near Forbes Field in Pittsburgh.

References

External links

1920 births
1991 deaths
Baseball players from Illinois
Chicago Cubs players
Gadsden Pilots players
Hutchinson Larks players
Los Angeles Angels (minor league) players
Major League Baseball second basemen
Major League Baseball shortstops
Major League Baseball third basemen
National League All-Stars
Paducah Indians players
Pittsburgh Pirates coaches
Pittsburgh Pirates players
St. Louis Browns players
People from Vermilion County, Illinois